Mlada is an opera-ballet in four acts, composed between 1889 and 1890 by Nikolai Rimsky-Korsakov, to a libretto by Viktor Krylov that was originally employed for an aborted project of the same name from 1872.

In the middle of Mlada, a fantasy tale about ancient pagan Slavs, Cleopatra emerges in a scene that exudes sensuality. Rimsky-Korsakov said "Among my musical impressions of Paris [at the World Exhibition, summer 1889] I reflect on music in Hungarian and Algerian cafes. The virtuoso playing of a Hungarian orchestra on tsevnitsas (Pan flutes) gave me the idea of introducing this ancient instrument... during the dances at Cleopatra's. In an Algerian cafe, I was attracted to the beat of a large drum... This effect I also borrowed for the scene of Cleopatra."

Performance history
The St. Petersburg premiere of Rimsky-Korsakov's setting of the libretto was given on 1 November 1892 and conducted by Eduard Nápravník. The scene designers were Ivan Andreyev and Mikhail Bocharov; balletmasters were Lev Ivanov and Enrico Cecchetti. The first production of Mlada was not a success, and it did not become a regular repertory item. (The decor, however, was reused for Petipa's 1896 revival of the ballet adaptation of the scenario by composer Ludwig Minkus, which had premiered in 1879.)

Other notable performances of Rimsky-Korsakov's Mlada were given in 1904 in St. Petersburg in the Great Hall of the St. Petersburg Conservatory by Tsereteli's opera company; in 1913 in Moscow by the Zimin Opera; and in 1923 in Petrograd at the State Theatre of Opera and Ballet.

A production from the 1990's of the opera-ballet at the Bolshoi Theatre was recorded on video.

Roles

Synopsis
Time: The ninth or tenth century
Place: The Slavic lands of the Baltic sea-coast, in the city of Rethra, near the Labe (Elbe) River, in modern-day Germany.

Act 1
Voyslava has killed Mlada, Yaromir's bride, to have him for herself. With the help of Morena, the goddess of the underworld, she has captivated Yaromir. But he sees the murder in his dreams.

Act 2
At the midsummer festival the people dance, while the spirit of Mlada intervenes between Yaromir and Voyslava.

Act 3
By night Mlada leads Yaromir up Mount Triglav, where the dead gather, before the Witches' Sabbath in which Yaromir is shown a vision of Cleopatra.

Act 4
Yaromir, at the Temple of Radegast, is shown by the spirits that Voyslava is guilty. She confesses her sin and he kills her. Morena, with whom Voyslava had made a compact, destroys the temple and the city of Rethra, but Yaromir is united with Mlada in heaven.

Concert excerpts
Two orchestral works were derived from the opera by the composer. The first, Night on Mt. Triglav, is an arrangement of Act 3. The second is a suite.

Night on Mt. Triglav (1899–1901)
This is a purely orchestral arrangement of Act III, restyled as a lengthy symphonic poem for orchestra.  Approximately a half-hour in duration, the program in the printed score follows the action of the opera during the corresponding act of the opera.
Suite from the Opera-Ballet Mlada (1903)
Introduction
Redowa: A Bohemian Dance
Lithuanian Dance
Indian Dance
Cortège

The Redowa appears in Act 1. The Lithuanian Dance and the Indian Dance are taken from Act 2, Scene 5. The cortège is the well-known Procession of the Nobles (literally, Procession of the Princes), and appears in Act 2, Scene 3.

Use in broadcast media
"Procession of the Nobles" is used as the theme for the PBS public affairs program Agronsky & Co. and its successor, Inside Washington, and was used between 1957 and 1969 as the opening theme for the UK TV programme What the Papers Say.

Recordings
role key: conductor/voyslava/morena/yaromir/mstivoy

Svetlanov/Tugarinova/Kulagina/Makhov/Korolyov, 1962, studio, Melodiya (detailed below)
Lazarev/Kasrashvili/Borisova/Kulko/Nikolsky, 1989, Moscow video, Videoland
Lazarev/Gavrilova/Borisova/Kulko/Nikolsky, 1992, Moscow video, Teldec
Tilson Thomas/Kazarnovskaya/Poretsky/Grigorian/Martirossian, 2002, live in San Francisco, pirate
Gergiev/Khudoley/Savova/Armonov/Petrenko-M, 2004, live in Amsterdam, Premiere Opera

Svetlanov recording details: Tatyana Tugarinova (Voyslava), Nina Kulagina (Morena), Vladimir Makhov (Yaromir), Alexey Korolyov (Mstivoy), Moscow Radio Symphony Chorus, Moscow Radio Symphony Orchestra

References
Notes

Sources
Abraham, Gerald. "Rimsky-Korsakov's Mlada," in On Russian Music.  London: W. Reeves, 1939; rpt. New York:  Books for Libraries, 1980.
Gaub, Albrecht. Die kollektive Ballett-Oper "Mlada": ein Werk von Kjui, Musorgskij, Rimskij-Korsakov, Borodin und Minkus. Studia slavica musicologica; Bd. 12. Berlin: Kuhn, 1998. 
Rimsky-Korsakov, N.A. My Musical Life.  Ed. with an introduction by Carl van Vechten; trans. by Judah A. Joffe.  3rd American ed.  A. A. Knopf, 1942.

External links
Piano-vocal score of the opera (Russian/French) at IMSLP
Russian libretto in a Word .doc file

Operas by Nikolai Rimsky-Korsakov
Russian-language operas
Operas
1890 operas
Opéras-ballets
1892 ballet premieres